Blackbud is the second studio album by Blackbud, released on June 8, 2009 on Independiente Records. It was the band's final release before going on an indefinite hiatus in 2010.

Upon release, drummer Sam Nadel stated that the album:

Track listing
"Left Your Arms Empty" - 3:21
"You Can Run" - 3:36
"Wandering Song" - 3:29
"Love Comes So Easy" - 4:25
"So It Seems" - 4:39
"Golden Girl" - 2:05
"Road to Nowhere" - 3:49
"Came Down Easy" - 3:56
"Outside Looking In" - 4:06
"I'll Be Here" - 4:11
"Darkness" - 4:24

Personnel
Joe Taylor - vocals, guitars
Sam Nadel - drums, backing vocals
Adam Newton - electric and double bass
Mike Crossey - producer, mixing
Jules Buckley - string arrangements, orchestrations
Kat Scheld - violin ("You Can Run")
Kath James - violin ("You Can Run")
Amy Wilson - viola ("You Can Run", "Road to Nowhere")
Ben Trigg - cello ("You Can Run", "Road to Nowhere")
Jennymay Logan - violin ("Road to Nowhere")
Martin Lissola - violin ("Road to Nowhere")
Loz Aldridge - recording assistant
Lee Slater - recording assistant
John Davis - mastering
Mark James - artwork

References

2009 albums
Blackbud albums
Independiente Records albums